This defunct hosting site is not related to Freedom Hosting Pty Ltd, which is operating in Australia.

Freedom Hosting is a defunct Tor specialist web hosting service that was established in 2008. At its height in August 2013, it was the largest Tor web host.

Anonymous denial-of-service attack 
In 2011, Anonymous launched Operation Darknet, an anti-child pornography effort against activities on the dark web. One of the largest sites, Lolita City, hosted by Freedom Hosting, was Denial-of-service attacked (DDoS), and later had its member list leaked following a SQL injection attack, as was The Hidden Wiki which linked to it.

Federal investigation
News reports linked a Firefox browser vulnerability to a United States Federal Bureau of Investigation (FBI) operation targeting Freedom Hosting's owner, Eric Eoin Marques. In August 2013, it was discovered that the Firefox browsers in many older versions of the Tor Browser Bundle were vulnerable to a JavaScript attack, as NoScript was not enabled by default. This attack was being exploited to send users' MAC and IP addresses and Windows computer names to the attackers. The FBI acknowledged they were responsible for the attack in a September 12, 2013 court filing in Dublin; further technical details from a training presentation leaked by Edward Snowden showed that the codename for the exploit was EgotisticalGiraffe.

Marques was arrested in Ireland on August 1, 2013, on a provisional extradition warrant issued by a United States court on the 29th of July that year. The FBI sought to extradite Marques to Maryland on four charges — distributing, conspiring to distribute, and advertising child pornography — as well as aiding and abetting advertising of child pornography. The warrant alleges that Marques was "the largest facilitator of child porn on the planet". His attorneys fought for several years to prevent his extradition to the United States on the grounds that he had Asperger syndrome, and would not receive the appropriate care in a US prison, if extradited. In December 2016, the Irish Court of Appeal ruled the extradition should proceed. This was not the end of his appeal process, however, and his lawyers announced they would make a new appeal to the Supreme Court. This appeal was dismissed by the Irish Supreme Court on March 20, 2019. Marques faced life in prison if tried and convicted in the United States. On February 6, 2020, Marques pleaded guilty to one count of conspiracy to advertise child abuse images, as part of a plea agreement that would entail a prison term of 15 to 21 years. On September 6, 2021, Marques was sentenced to 27 years imprisonment and ordered to forfeit over $154,000.

Notable hosted sites 
 HackBB
 Lolita City
 Tor Mail
 The Hidden Wiki

Proceeding site
Since Freedom Hosting was closed, a new organization, Freedom Hosting II was created, running 20 percent of all dark web sites.

References 

Defunct Tor hidden services
Dark web
Web hosting
Internet properties established in 2008
Internet properties disestablished in 2013